Chhededaha is a newly formed rural municipality in Bajura District in the Sudurpashchim Province of Nepal. It was formed in March, 2017  in line with the Constitution of Nepal 2015  as per the requirement of Ministry of Federal Affairs and General Administration. The name of this municipality is originated after the name famous taal of this area Chhededha Taal.

History
It is formed by merging previous VDCs named Kanda, Jayabageshwari, Gudukhati, Atichaur and Dogadi.

It is the biggest rural municipality in terms of population and fourth biggest on the basis of area. It is divided into seven wards and the headquarter of this newly formed rural municipality is at Dogadi.

Demographics
At the time of the 2011 Nepal census, Chhededaha Rural Municipality had a population of 18,741. Of these, 99.9% spoke Nepali and 0.1% other languages as their first language.

In terms of ethnicity/caste, 73.4% were Chhetri, 8.2% Kami, 3.7% Sarki, 3.3% Sanyasi/Dasnami, 2.8% Damai/Dholi, 2.6% Thakuri, 1.6% Hill Brahmin, 1.4% other Dalit, 1.4% Badi, 0.7% Tharu, 0.3% Lohar, 0.3% Kumal, 0.1% other Terai and 0.2% others.

In terms of religion, 99.8% were Hindu, 0.1% Buddhist and 0.1% others.

References

Rural municipalities in Bajura District
Rural municipalities of Nepal established in 2017